The dahong palay (also spelled dinahong palay, dahon palay or dahompalay), literally "rice leaf" in Tagalog, is a single-edged sword from the southern Tagalog provinces of the Philippines. It was originally used by farmers to clear thick grass growth. However, during the Philippine revolution of 1896, farmers from Batangas soon came to favor it for its "slashing and thrusting" feel.

Etymology 
The sword's name could either be a reference to the similarity of its shape to the leaves of rice or to local green "dahong palay" snakes, purported to be extremely venomous. The snake is probably the green specimen of the Philippine pit viper (trimeresurus flavomaculatus), though sometimes identified as various relatively harmless green snakes, like vine snakes.

Physical description 
The dahong palay's size is about the same as most Filipino swords such as the kalis, golok, or ginunting, measuring about twenty to thirty inches.

Blade 
The blade is single-edged and has what is classified as a normal blade pattern – that is, it has a curved cutting edge, and a back which is virtually flat at the tip.

The width of the blade is at its fullest at the hand guard, and from there the sharp edge tapers smoothly, with only the slightest curve or "belly" as it moves towards the tip of the sword.  In contrast, the back of the blade only begins to curve downward as it nears the hilt, which in turn also curves downwards, completing the "rice leaf" tapering profile of the sword.

The tip of this "rice leaf" profile is an acute and very sharp point, which gives the blade its penetrating capability when used in a thrusting motion.  The balance and steep profile of the sword, in turn, gives it its cutting ability when used in a slashing motion.

Hilt 
The sword's full tang is embedded in a long hilt, traditionally made of kamagong wood.  As previously explained, this hilt tilts downwards, contributing to the sword's unique profile.  Aside from that, however, the exact shape of the hilt, varies significantly from piece to piece, with the pommel and grip not always distinct parts of the hilt, and a crossguard that isn't present in all pieces.  In addition, the dahong palay'''s origins as an agricultural tool means that the hilts are often simple and practical, rather than ornate as is often the case in the kalis or kampilan.

 Varieties outside Tagalog region 
While strongly associated with Tagalog people, dahong palay can also be found in other parts of Luzon. Notably among Ilocano and Pangasinan peoples of northern Luzon and Bicolanos of Bicol peninsula in southern Luzon.

 Ilocos 
Among the Ilocanos, the blade is called bulong pagay, which is direct translation of the Tagalog name which means "rice leaf". The profile is slightly different as the top edge does not have a downturn curve towards the tip, aside from such distinction, the over all specifications of the blade is more or less similar with its Tagalog counterpart.

 Bicol 
In Bicol Region, the blade retains its Tagalog name, albeit also slightly different from the typical profile found in Laguna province in Calabarzon. Generally, the dahong palay blades in this region are shorter compared to its counter parts in other region.
 In history 
The dahong palay was initially used for agricultural work since pre-colonial times, and later on, was used for dambana practices as well. As a weapon, the dahong palay'' was a mainstay during the many conflicts that have plagued the Southern Tagalog region since its first use during the Philippine revolution against the Spanish – used by farmer-warriors whenever they could not acquire firearms. It is noted for having been used by Filipino soldiers under the Philippine Commonwealth Army and Philippine Constabulary units and the recognized guerrillas in the region during World War II.

Gallery

See also 
List of Filipino weaponry
 Bolo
 Golok
 Kalis
 Kampilan
Filipino martial arts

Military history of the Philippines

References 

Filipino swords
World War II infantry weapons
Weapons of the Philippines
Weapons of the Philippine Army
Culture of Batangas
Culture of Occidental Mindoro
Culture of Oriental Mindoro